Allan Igor Moreno Silva (born August 6, 1992 from São Luís/MA) is a Brazilian player in the International draughts. He won Panamerican championship in 2011, 2013, 2015 and 2016, champion of Brazil in International draughts 2015. International Grandmaster (GMI).

World Championship

International draughts
 2011 (18 place)
 2013 (14 place in final B)
 2015 (10 place)
 2019 (11 place)

Panamerican Championship

International draughts
 2011 (1 place)
 2013 (1 place)
 2015 (1 place)
 2016 (1 place)
 2018 (2 place)

International tournaments
 2016: Salou Open (2 place in blitz)

External links
Pfofile, FMJD
Pfofile, KNDB

References

1992 births
Living people
Brazilian draughts players
Players of international draughts